The 1977 Tipperary Senior Hurling Championship was the 87th staging of the Tipperary Senior Hurling Championship since its establishment by the Tipperary County Board in 1887.

Moneygall were the defending champions.

On 23 October 1977, Kilruane MacDonaghs won the championship after a 1-05 to 0-05 defeat of Borris-Ileigh in a final replay at Semple Stadium. It was their first ever championship title.

Results

Quarter-finals

Semi-finals

Final

Championship statistics

Top scorers

Overall

In a single game

References

Tipperary
Tipperary Senior Hurling Championship